Aleksandar Atanacković (29 April 1920 – 12 March 2005) was a Serbian footballer who was part of Yugoslavia national football team at the 1948 Summer Olympics and the 1950 FIFA World Cup. He later became a manager. His first name has also been written as Aleksa.

References

External links
 Profile at Serbian federation site

1920 births
2005 deaths
Serbian footballers
Yugoslav footballers
Yugoslavia international footballers
Association football midfielders
SK Jugoslavija players
FK Partizan players
Yugoslav First League players
1950 FIFA World Cup players
Olympic footballers of Yugoslavia
Olympic silver medalists for Yugoslavia
Footballers at the 1948 Summer Olympics
Serbian football managers
Yugoslav football managers
FK Partizan managers
FK Budućnost Podgorica managers
FK Sarajevo managers
Olympic medalists in football
Footballers from Belgrade
Medalists at the 1948 Summer Olympics